Rosewater is the hydrosol portion of the distillate of rose petals. 

Rosewater may also refer to:
Rosewater syndrome, a type of Androgen insensitivity syndrome
Rosewater, South Australia, a suburb of Adelaide
Rosewater Limited Liability Company, a homeless advocacy organization
Rosewater (film), a film based on the memoir Then They Came for Me by Maziar Bahari.
Rosewater (video game), a point and click Western adventure game by Grundislav Games
Rosewater (novel), a 2016 novel by Tade Thompson

People named Rosewater 
 Mark Rosewater (b. 1967), a game designer

Fictional characters 
Amanda Rosewater, a character in the science fiction television series Defiance
God Bless You, Mr. Rosewater, a novel by Kurt Vonnegut, Jr.
Eliot Rosewater, a character in the novel
Alex Rosewater, a primary villain in The Big O Anime Series

See also 
  Rose Bay (disambiguation), places named Rose Bay